Brambles Farm is a small housing estate in east Middlesbrough, England with a population of 3,200. It lies to the north of Thorntree and east of Pallister.

Schools
Brambles Primary Academy, part of the Navigate Academies
Trust, is a primary school in Brambles Farm. Teaching and learning at Brambles
Primary Academy are considered to be ‘outstanding’, by Ofsted.  The school works closely with its partner
academies in the Navigate Academies Trust, including Pennyman Primary Academy, in nearby Netherfields.

Brambles Farm FC

Local residents formed this football team to combat anti-social behaviour among some of its youths.

References

External links

Areas within Middlesbrough